Clarrie Scrutton (26 March 1899 – 24 September 1982) was an Australian rules footballer who played with Sturt in the South Australian National Football League (SANFL).

On 5 May 1923, Clarrie, alongside Stan and Gordon became part of the first trio of brothers to play for Sturt at the same time.

References

External links 		
Clarrie Scrutton's profile at AustralianFootball.com

1899 births
1982 deaths
Sturt Football Club players
Australian rules footballers from South Australia